Geoffrey Lynch (Mayor), aka Geffere Lynch, 4th Mayor of Galway, fl. 1488-1489.

Lynch was a member of one of The Tribes of Galway, and during his term of office he oversaw the introduction of the Dominican Order into Galway from Athenry. They were given a site overlooking The Claddagh, on the west bank of the river Corrib.

Lynch is said to have been knighted. He was married to a daughter of Walter Font and had at least one child, Anastasia Lynch. He may be the Geffere Lynch who was elected mayor in 1500.

References
 History of Galway, James Hardiman, Galway, 1820.
 Old Galway, Maureen Donovan O'Sullivan, 1942.
 Henry, William (2002). Role of Honour: The Mayors of Galway City 1485-2001. Galway: Galway City Council.  
 Martyn, Adrian (2016). The Tribes of Galway: 1124-1642

Politicians from County Galway
Mayors of Galway
15th-century Irish politicians